Kariz Khaneh (also Romanized as Kārīz Khāneh; also known as Kārīz Khān (Persian: كاريزخان), Shāzdeh (Persian: شازده), and Qal‘eh Kārīz) is a village in Salehabad Rural District, Salehabad County, Razavi Khorasan Province, Iran. At the 2006 census, its population was 125, in 32 families.

References 

Populated places in   Torbat-e Jam County